(Z)-Stilbene is a diarylethene, that is, a hydrocarbon consisting of a cis ethene double bond substituted with a phenyl group on both carbon atoms of the double bond. The name stilbene was derived from the Greek word , which means shining.

Isomers
Stilbene exists as two possible isomers known as (E)-stilbene and (Z)-stilbene. (Z)-Stilbene is sterically hindered and less stable because the steric interactions force the aromatic rings 43° out-of-plane and prevent conjugation.

Uses
 Stilbene is used in manufacture of dyes and optical brighteners, and also as a phosphor and a scintillator.
 Stilbene is one of the gain mediums used in dye lasers.

Properties
 Stilbene will typically have the chemistry of a diarylethene, a conjugated alkene.
 Stilbene can undergo photoisomerization under the influence of UV light.
 Stilbene can undergo stilbene photocyclization, an intramolecular reaction.
 (Z)-Stilbene can undergo electrocyclic reactions.

Natural occurrence
Many stilbene derivatives (stilbenoids) are present naturally in plants. An example is resveratrol and its cousin, pterostilbene.

References

Luminescence
Fluorescent dyes
Phosphors and scintillators
Laser gain media
Stilbenoids
Phenyl compounds